Kim Dong-hwi (born December 26, 1995) is a South Korean actor. He started his career in commercial films like The Royal Tailor (2014).

Filmography

Film

Television series

Web series

Awards and nominations

References

External links

 
 

Living people
1995 births
21st-century South Korean male actors
South Korean male film actors
South Korean male television actors
South Korean male web series actors
Seoul Institute of the Arts alumni